Peter Baynham is a Welsh screenwriter and performer. He is best known for appearing in a series of comedic Pot Noodle television adverts in the 1990s. His work largely represents collaborations with comedy figures such as Armando Iannucci, Steve Coogan, Chris Morris, Sacha Baron Cohen, and Sarah Smith. Born in Cardiff, Baynham served the Merchant Navy after leaving school and later pursued a career in comedy — first in stand-up, and then as a writer and performer for various news and sketch comedies in radio and television while enjoying personal fame starring in Pot Noodle adverts. He then became a writer in feature film.

In television, with Iannucci he is writer for I'm Alan Partridge, developing the character Alan Partridge as performed by Coogan, and as writer and host of the Armistice review shows. With Morris, he is writer for The Day Today, Brass Eye, and Jam. Baynham himself created the animated series I Am Not an Animal. In feature film, with Baron Cohen he is writer for Borat! Cultural Learnings of America for Make Benefit Glorious Nation of Kazakhstan (2006), Brüno (2009), Grimsby (2016), and Borat Subsequent Moviefilm (2020). With Smith, he is writer for Arthur Christmas (2011) and Ron's Gone Wrong (2021). With Iannucci and Coogan, he is writer for Alan Partridge: Alpha Papa (2013). Other features as writer include Arthur (2011) and Hotel Transylvania (2012).

Early life
Baynham was born and raised in Cardiff as the second of four children. He attended St Mary's primary school in Canton, then Lady Mary RC High School in Cyncoed. Baynham said he found school difficult, finding himself shy, "weedy", and unpopular. He found himself too unathletic to enjoy rugby, despite expectations from his father. He left school with eight O-Levels, four with an "A" grade, and joined the Merchant Navy at age 16 with a desire to travel the world. Baynham described his experience in the Merchant Navy as unsuited to his character, he said "I was with men who drank beer for breakfast. A lot of them were fascist, and I mean really fascist. They say travel should broaden the mind but these blokes would have been kicked out of the Ku Klux Klan for being too extreme". Duties included performing operations on a chemical tanker while wearing a hazmat suit. He reflected, "I'm small and would basically float around inside the suit like a confused foetus, trying to pick up spanners and operate a walkie-talkie". Baynham is qualified to navigate a supertanker. After five years, he was made redundant due to government cuts in defence. He went on to serve as second mate on a private yacht in Monte Carlo as a summer job.

Career

1987-2004: radio and television
In 1987 he moved to London with his brother and worked selling advertising space in The Guardian newspaper. He began attending a comedy workshop, The Comedy Store. He became a stand-up comedian, and created the character Mr Buckstead, a psychotic teacher and poet. Baynham said the act consisted of "[talking] about the terrible things he did to his pupils". During this period he financially supported himself with self-employment income under the Enterprise Allowance Scheme, his redundancy cheque from Merchant Navy, and a bank loan that was nominally meant for buying a car. He earned around £20 (GBP) per gig, and made £4,500 in his first year. To additionally support himself, he wrote sketches for the topical radio comedy Week Ending. He earned £18 for each minute of material, and contributed around two minutes of material each week. After four years he felt his stand-up career was not progressing, and decided to commit to radio. He became cast for the comedy sketch radio series Fist of Fun.

Aiming to break into television, Baynham wrote one-liner jokes for a Friday night show presented by Terry Wogan. He was unimpressed by Wogan's delivery of the jokes. Baynham, working at the BBC offices, encountered Armando Iannucci while looking for photocopier paper. Iannucci would introduce him to Chris Morris, who was creating the news satire The Day Today. Although Morris was not interested in accepting more writers for the project, he was made a writer after Morris was impressed by a sketch he wrote that involved horses infesting the London Underground. He also appears in a sketch as a reporter named Colin Poppshed who presented "Gay News", where he farcically announces the gayness of various "roads, periodic table elements, cars, and walls". He also became a guest and contributor for the radio series The Chris Morris Music Show; he was suspended by the BBC for two weeks for conceiving a joke where Morris falsely implies on air that Michael Heseltine had died. Baynham stated that Morris technically did not announce his death, and had only said "if there is any news of Michael Heseltine's death in the next hour, we'll let you know". Other radio work included being cast for Lee and Herring.

Baynham became a writer for the sitcom I'm Alan Partridge, a spin-off of the comedy character Alan Partridge as performed by Steve Coogan in The Day Today, an incompetent sports reporter progressed as a tactless and self-satisfied television personality. He thought that Alan Partridge was underdeveloped because the format of The Day Today made him "bracketed and contained within presenting to [the] camera". Here he would realise Alan Partridge as a "three-dimensional" character. He, with the writing team, applied worldbuilding, such as establishing the geography of Alan Partridge's residence of "Linton Travel Tavern". Coogan credited Baynham for making Alan Partridge more human and sympathetic. Baynham described his work on I'm Alan Partridge as a highly productive and enjoyable period of his career, saying "It's my happiest, most fun writing experience ever really, it was just so exciting".

In the same period, Fist of Fun transferred to television where Baynham makes an on-screen appearance of his character "Peter", a "stinking 32-year-old Welsh virgin". He also served as writer and host of the Armistice news review shows. Baynham created and performed the character "Terry from Pontypridd" in a popular television advertising campaign for Pot Noodle, promoted with the catchphrase "they're too gorgeous". The campaign propelled him to unexpected fame; he reported that strangers would shout "gorgeous" at him in public, and that a university student threw a Pot Noodle at him on stage while touring with Lee and Herring. Other television work include Brass Eye with Morris, notably as writer for the controversial special "Paedogeddon!" that attracted widespread media attention for its comedic portrayal of paedophilia. Other credits include writer for episodes of Bob and Margaret, and writing additional material for the sketch show Big Train. He served as writer for the radio series Blue Jam, which transferred to television as Jam. He also became a guest for the radio comedy game show The 99p Challenge.

He became writer for the animated sketch comedy Monkey Dust. He created the animated black comedy I am Not an Animal, which follows a group of intelligent talking animals who escape a vivisection laboratory.

2005-present: feature film
Baynham felt uncertain about his future in television after I Am Not an Animal was poorly received by BBC executives, one of whom told him, "I won't be paying a return visit to this". Meanwhile, he received a phone call from Sacha Baron Cohen who asked him if he could help continue his faltering feature film project he had been working on based on the comedy character Borat. Baynham replied that he was not interested because he was working on creating his own sitcom, but then changed his mind and phoned Baron Cohen later that day expressing interest, and became writer for the 2006 film Borat! Cultural Learnings of America for Make Benefit Glorious Nation of Kazakhstan. After the success of Borat, he continued his collaboration with Baron Cohen and became writer for the 2009 film Brüno.

Under director Jason Winer he became writer for the 2011 film Arthur, a recreation of the 1981 film starring Russell Brand.

Earlier, in 2005, Baynham conceived of a Christmas story where Santa Claus has an "impractical and useless" son, and collaborated with Sarah Smith at Aardman Animations to write a screenplay for the 2011 film Arthur Christmas. The story deals with Santa's global operation to deliver presents to every child, which Baynham said he considered with "pedantic" detail, such as what would be mathematically possible in 12 hours with one million elves and a mile wide spaceship.

Under director Genndy Tartakovsky he became writer for the 2012 animated film Hotel Transylvania.

Baynham collaborated with Iannucci and Coogan again to create a feature film based on Alan Partridge, and became writer for the 2013 film Alan Partridge: Alpha Papa.

With Baron Cohen again he became writer for the 2016 film Grimsby, and continued this collaboration as writer for the 2020 film Borat Subsequent Moviefilm, a sequel to the previous Borat film.

In 2021, Baynham - along with close friend and long-time collaborator Jeremy Simmonds - launched the surreal comedy podcast Brain Cigar. This has so far run to six episodes and a 'Christmas special'.

Reputation
Baynham is largely unknown for his writing credits. James Rampton writing for The Independent described him as "an anonymous foot-soldier in Armando Iannucci's all-conquering comedy army". Brendon Connelley writing for /Film said, "Baynham isn't exactly comedy royalty in the UK — more like a secret power behind the thrones". Baynham himself reflected, "It feels quite cool, in a mad way, to be someone who skulks about in the shadows". Nonetheless, he is recognized as quietly influential for the cultural impact resulting from his work on Alan Partridge, Brass Eye, and Borat. Kathryn Williams for WalesOnline argued that he "revolutionised both topical satire and character comedy in the 1990s", along with Iannucci, Coogan, and Morris.

Personal life
Baynham settled in Los Angeles after completing Borat.

Filmography
Features as writer:
Borat! Cultural Learnings of America for Make Benefit Glorious Nation of Kazakhstan (2006)
Brüno (2009)
Arthur (2011)
Arthur Christmas (2011)
Hotel Transylvania (2012)
Alan Partridge: Alpha Papa (2013)
Grimsby (2016)
Borat Subsequent Moviefilm (2020)
Ron's Gone Wrong (2021)

References

External links

Baynham article from The Guardian on "dark" humour
Baynham entry on Cookdandbombd
Peter Baynham – His Own Bit, in The Guardian
BBC Comedy A-Z
Brain Cigar Website

Welsh male comedians
British radio writers
Living people
Mass media people from Cardiff
Mass media people from Los Angeles
British Merchant Navy personnel
Sony Pictures Animation people
Year of birth missing (living people)